Carlos Atanes (born November 8, 1971) is a Spanish film director, writer and playwright. He was born in Barcelona, and is a member of The Film-Makers' Cooperative, founded by Jonas Mekas, Shirley Clarke, Ken Jacobs, Andy Warhol, Jack Smith and others. His first finished feature-length movie was FAQ: Frequently Asked Questions, which he released in 2004. The movie won the Best Feature Film Award at the Athens Panorama of Independent Filmmakers in 2005 and was also nominated for the Méliès d'Argent at Fantasporto that same year.

Reception 
Critics often express the difficulty of valuing Atanes' cinematography and sometimes they even refrain from scoring it, since these are unusual films that escape the standard classification. Dave J. Wilson from Cinematic Shocks says regarding Maximum Shame “it exists outside of the cinematic norm not following its conventions (…) it is purely visual art rather than a real narrative a dreamlike mind-fuck of philosophical musings. It is not a question of whether it is good or not as it does not conform to cinematic conventions. Therefore, I will not be giving a rating for this review, as it is hard for me to judge it on such terms. Whether you like the film or not you will ultimately more likely all reach the same conclusion that it is at least a unique work.” Film Threat, meanwhile, says that within Gallino, the Chicken System “is an entire universe of creativity, albeit one that may or may not reflect this plane of reality as we know it. I don't know that the traditional sense of how we react to film applies here. It's more of an art experience than a simple film (…) I don't know that it's for everyone (or anyone), but it's certainly unique.”

As a writer 
In addition to his work as a screenwriter and playwright, Carlos Atanes has published several books and essays on cultural issues, cinema and Chaos magic.

Filmography as director
La ira (1989)
Le Descente à l’enfer d’un poète (1990)
Romanzio in el sècolo ventuno (1991)
Els Peixos argentats a la peixera (1991)
Morir de calor (1991)
The Marvellous World of the Cucu Bird (1991)
Els Peixos Argentats a la Peixera (1991, co-directed with Hermann Bonnin)
El Parc (1992, co-directed with Hermann Bonnin)
The Mental Tenor (1993)
The Metamorphosis of Franz Kafka (1993)
Metaminds & Metabodies (1995)
Morfing (1996)
Borneo (1997)
The Seven Hills of Rome (1998)
Welcome to Spain (1999)
Cyberspace Under Control (2000)
Perdurabo (Where is Aleister Crowley?) (2003)
FAQ: Frequently Asked Questions (2004) 
Proxima (2007) 
Made in Proxima (2007)
Codex Atanicus (2007)
Scream Queen (2008)
Maximum Shame (2010)
Gallino, the Chicken System (2012)
Meat Market - Esa Linna (2013) (Music video)
Romance bizarro (2017)

Released plays

 2021 – Rey de Marte (Dramatic reading, Las Palmas de Gran Canaria)
 2021 – Báthory (Dramatic reading, Madrid)
 2019 – Antimateria (Tenerife)
 2018 – Amaya Galeote's La incapacidad de exprimirte (Madrid)
 2018 – La línea del horizonte (Madrid)
 2015 – Un genio olvidado (Un rato en la vida de Charles Howard Hinton) (Madrid)
 2014 – La quinta estación del puto Vivaldi (Madrid)
 2014 – Los ciclos atánicos (Madrid)
 2013 – El triunfo de la mediocridad (Madrid)
 2013 – Secretitos (Madrid)
 2011 – El hombre de la pistola de nata (Madrid)
 2011 – La cobra en la cesta de mimbre (Madrid)

Brief plays 

 2019 – ¿Hasta cuándo estáis? (Madrid)
 2019 – A Praga y vámonos (Madrid)
 2018 – Chéjov bajo cero (Málaga)
 2017 – Sexo y tortilla (Madrid)
 2017 – Pasión mostrenca (Madrid)
 2016 – La abuela de Frankenstein (Madrid)
 2016 – Love is in the Box (Madrid)
 2015 – Caminando por el valle inquietante (Madrid)
 2015 – Santos varones (Madrid)
 2015 – Porno emocional (Madrid)
 2014 – El grifo de 5.000.000 euros (Madrid)
 2014 – El vello público (Madrid)
 2013 – Necrofilia fina (Madrid)
 2013 – Romance bizarro (Madrid)
 2012 – La lluvia (Madrid)
 2012 – La depredadora (Leganés)

Bibliography

 2021 – Filmar los sueños (Essay) – 
 2018 – Magia del Caos para escépticos (Essay) – ; tr. Chaos Magic For Skeptics, Mandrake of Oxford 2022 – 
 2018 – Demos lo que sobre a los perros (Essay) – 
 2017 – Un genio olvidado (Un rato en la vida de Charles Howard Hinton) (Theatre) – 
 2013 – Aleister Crowley in the Mouth of Hell: The screenplay never filmed – 
 2007 – Los trabajos del director (Essay) – 
 2003 – El hombre de la pistola de nata (Theatre) – 
 2002 – Confutatis Maledictis (Novel) – 
 2002 – La cobra en la cesta de mimbre (Theatre) – 
 2001 – Combustión espontánea de un jurado (Novel) –

Collective books 

 2022 – Querida - A Doll's Tale of Misery and Liberation (Novel illustrated by Jan van Rijn)
 2022 – Monstruos (Essay, Carlos Atanes et al.) – 
 2021 – La invasión de los ultracuerpos, de Philip Kaufman (Essay, Carlos Atanes et al.) – 
 2020 – Cine que hoy no se podría rodar (Essay, Carlos Atanes et al.) – 
 2020 – Eyes Wide Shut (Essay, Carlos Atanes et al.) – 
 2020 – Space Fiction: Visiones de lo cósmico en la ciencia ficción (Essay, Carlos Atanes et al.) – 
 2019 – De Arrebato a Zulueta (Essay, Carlos Atanes et al.) – 
 2016 – In the Woods & on the Heath (Artbook illustrated by Jan van Rijn)
 2010 – La Bestia en la pantalla. Aleister Crowley y el cine fantástico (Essay, Carlos Atanes et al.) –

Notes

External links
 
 
 https://lylagencia.com/author-book/carlos-atanes/?lang=en
 https://film-makerscoop.com/filmmakers/carlos-atanes-2

1971 births
Living people
Spanish dramatists and playwrights
Spanish male dramatists and playwrights
Spanish film directors
Spanish experimental filmmakers
20th-century Spanish writers
20th-century Spanish male writers
21st-century Spanish writers